With the advice and consent of the United States Senate, the president of the United States appoints the members of the Supreme Court of the United States, which is the highest court of the federal judiciary of the United States. Following his victory in the 2016 presidential election, Republican Donald Trump took office as president on January 20, 2017, and faced an immediate vacancy on the Supreme Court due to the February 2016 death of Associate Justice Antonin Scalia. During the 2016 campaign, Trump had released two lists of potential nominees to the Supreme Court. After taking office, he nominated Neil Gorsuch to succeed Scalia, and Gorsuch was confirmed in April 2017. In November 2017, five more names were added to the previous lists of potential nominees. In June 2018, Associate Justice Anthony Kennedy announced his retirement, creating a second vacancy on the Supreme Court. In early July 2018, Trump nominated Brett Kavanaugh as his replacement; Kavanaugh was confirmed on October 6, 2018. Following the death of Associate Justice Ruth Bader Ginsburg on September 18, 2020, Trump nominated Amy Coney Barrett as her replacement on September 26, 2020. Exactly a month later on October 26, 2020, Barrett was confirmed by a vote of 52–48.

The Gorsuch, Kavanaugh and Barrett confirmations were enabled by a rule change made by Senate Republicans in 2017, which applied the so-called nuclear option to Supreme Court nominees and allowed nominations to be advanced by a simple majority vote rather than the historical norm of a three-fifths supermajority vote. Leonard Leo played a crucial role in selecting Trump's appointees and helping them successfully navigate their Senate confirmation hearings.

Court composition under Trump

President Donald Trump began his term in January 2017 with a vacancy to be filled as a result of the February 2016 death of Justice Antonin Scalia. As three of the Court's justices at the time—Ruth Bader Ginsburg (born 1933), Anthony Kennedy (born 1936) and Stephen Breyer (born 1938)—were aged 78 or older, speculation arose that additional vacancies could occur during Trump's four-year presidential term. Because Ginsburg and Breyer were part of the liberal wing of the Court and Kennedy was a swing vote who often aligned with them on social issues, many top political analysts saw Trump's term as a chance for Republicans to reshape the court significantly towards a more conservative vision of the law. On June 27, 2018, this became a real possibility when Justice Kennedy officially announced his retirement. Following the death of Ginsburg on September 18, 2020, and the subsequent confirmation of Amy Coney Barrett on October 26, 2020, the Supreme Court had the following nine justices:

Nomination of Neil Gorsuch

On February 13, 2016, Associate Justice Antonin Scalia died while vacationing at Cibolo Creek Ranch near Marfa, Texas. Scalia's death marked just the second time in 60 years that a sitting Supreme Court justice died. This resulted in there being a Supreme Court vacancy during the last year of Barack Obama's presidency.

Mitch McConnell, the Republican Senate majority leader, stated that the new president, whoever won the 2016 election, should replace Scalia, while President Obama stated that he planned to nominate someone to replace Scalia on the Supreme Court. On February 23, the 11 Republican members of the Senate Judiciary Committee signed a letter to McConnell stating their intention to withhold consent on any nominee made by Obama, and that no hearings would occur until after January 20, 2017, when the new president took office. On March 16, 2016, Obama nominated then-chief judge Merrick Garland (of the United States Court of Appeals for the District of Columbia Circuit), to replace Scalia. After Garland's nomination, McConnell reiterated his position that the Senate would not consider any Supreme Court nomination until a new president took office. Garland's nomination expired on January 3, 2017, with the Senate having taken no action on it.

Trump rejected any move by Obama to fill the vacancy, maintaining that picking a successor to Scalia should be done by the next president. During his 2016 presidential campaign, Trump released two lists of potential Supreme Court nominees. On May 18, 2016, he released a short list of 11 judges for nomination to the Scalia vacancy. Then, on September 23, 2016, he released a second list of 10 possible nominees, this time including three minorities. Both lists were assembled by lawyers associated with the Federalist Society and the Heritage Foundation. Days after Trump's inauguration, Politico named three individuals as the front-runners for Scalia's position: Neil Gorsuch, Thomas Hardiman and Bill Pryor, with Trump reportedly later narrowing his list down to Gorsuch and Hardiman. At the time of the nomination, Gorsuch, Hardiman, and Pryor were all federal appellate judges who had been appointed by President George W. Bush. President Trump and White House counsel Don McGahn interviewed those three individuals as well as Judge Amul Thapar of the U.S. District Court for Eastern District of Kentucky in the weeks before the nomination. Trump announced Gorsuch as his nominee on January 31. The Senate confirmed Gorsuch by a 54–45 vote on April 7, 2017, with votes from 51 Republicans and 3 Democrats. He was sworn into office as an associate justice of the Supreme Court on April 10.

Nomination of Brett Kavanaugh

On June 27, 2018, Justice Anthony Kennedy announced his retirement from the Supreme Court, effective July 31, giving Trump an opportunity to send a second Supreme Court nominee to the Senate for confirmation. Kavanaugh was officially nominated on July 9, selected from among a list of "25 highly qualified potential nominees" considered by the Trump Administration. Kavanaugh's nomination was officially sent to the Senate on July 10, 2018, and confirmation hearings began on September 4. The hearings took longer than initially expected over objections to the withholding of documents pertinent to Kavanaugh's time in the Bush administration as a lawyer, and due to the presence of protestors.

On September 16, 2018, Christine Blasey Ford alleged a then-17 year old Kavanaugh sexually assaulted her in 1982, in what she described as an attempted rape. The accusation delayed the scheduled September 20 vote. After Ford's accusation, Kavanaugh indicated he would not withdraw. Ford's allegations were followed by an accusation of sexual assault by Yale classmate Deborah Ramirez, and a letter from Julie Swetnick accusing Kavanaugh of gang rape in high school. Ford and Kavanaugh appeared before the Senate Judiciary Committee for a hearing on September 27, and were questioned by Arizona sex crimes prosecutor Rachel Mitchell and members of the Senate. The Judiciary Committee voted to approve Kavanaugh on September 28 after Jeff Flake, considered to be a swing vote, declared his intent to vote in favor of the nomination with the provision that there would be a new FBI investigation into the allegations by Ford. The investigation concluded on October 4. Two days later, Kavanaugh was confirmed by a 50–48 vote, and sworn in that same day.

Nomination of Amy Coney Barrett

Justice Ruth Bader Ginsburg died on September 18, 2020. The following day, Trump stated that any successor of Ginsburg would "most likely" be a woman.  On September 25, 2020, it was announced that Trump intended to nominate Amy Coney Barrett to succeed Ruth Bader Ginsburg as Associate Justice of the Supreme Court of the United States. On October 26, 2020, Barrett was confirmed by a vote of 52–48. She was sworn in the next day.

Possible nominees
Below is a list of individuals which President Trump identified as his potential nominees for Supreme Court appointments. Most of them were revealed in two lists released by the Trump campaign in 2016. Others were added in a revised list released by the White House on November 17, 2017 and a fourth list released on September 9, 2020

Following the nomination of Amul Thapar to the Sixth Circuit, it was reported that Trump might try to season some of the candidates on his list with federal appellate court experience prior to potential nomination to the Supreme Court. Indeed, Trump later elevated a number of state court judges from his list to fill vacant positions on the federal Courts of Appeals: Joan Larsen (Sixth Circuit), David Stras (Eighth Circuit), Allison H. Eid (Tenth Circuit), Don Willett (Fifth Circuit), and Britt Grant (Eleventh Circuit). Conversely, two previous Trump appointees to the Courts of Appeals—Amy Coney Barrett (Seventh Circuit) and Kevin Newsom (Eleventh Circuit)—were later added to the list of potential Supreme Court candidates.

Despite speculation that Trump might consider other candidates for a possible second Supreme Court nomination, he said in May 2017 that he would make his next appointment from the same list he used to choose Gorsuch (the combined 21 names given on either of the two lists he released during the campaign), describing the list as "a big thing" for him and his supporters. Trump added five further candidates to the list on November 17, 2017.

United States courts of appeals
 Court of Appeals for the D.C. Circuit
 Gregory G. Katsas‡ (born 1964) (appointed by Trump)
 Brett Kavanaugh† (born 1965) (nominated and confirmed)
 Court of Appeals for the 3rd Circuit
 Thomas Hardiman* (born 1965)
 Peter J. Phipps‡ (born 1973) (appointed by Trump)
 Court of Appeals for the 4th Circuit
 Allison Jones Rushing‡ (born 1982) (appointed by Trump)
 Court of Appeals for the 5th Circuit
 Kyle Duncan‡ (born 1972) (appointed by Trump)
 James C. Ho‡ (born 1973) (appointed by Trump)
 Don Willett* (born 1966) (appointed by Trump)
 Court of Appeals for the 6th Circuit
 Raymond Kethledge* (born 1966)
 Joan Larsen* (born 1968) (appointed by Trump)
 Amul Thapar** (born 1969) (elevated by Trump)
 Court of Appeals for the 7th Circuit
 Amy Coney Barrett† (born 1972) (appointed by Trump) (nominated and confirmed)
 Diane Sykes* (born 1957)
 Court of Appeals for the 8th Circuit
 Steven Colloton* (born 1963)
 Raymond Gruender* (born 1963)
 David Stras* (born 1974) (appointed by Trump)
 Court of Appeals for the 9th Circuit
 Bridget S. Bade‡ (born 1965) (appointed by Trump)
 Lawrence VanDyke‡ (born 1972) (appointed by Trump)
 Court of Appeals for the 10th Circuit
 Allison Eid* (born 1965) (appointed by Trump)
 Neil Gorsuch** (born 1967) (nominated and confirmed)
 Timothy Tymkovich** (born 1956)
 Court of Appeals for the 11th Circuit
 Britt Grant† (born 1978) (appointed by Trump)
 Barbara Lagoa‡ (born 1967) (appointed by Trump)
 Kevin Newsom† (born 1972) (appointed by Trump)
 Bill Pryor* (born 1962)
 Court of Appeals for the Armed Forces
 Margaret A. Ryan** (born 1964)

United States district courts
 Federico A. Moreno** (born 1952) – senior judge, United States District Court for the Southern District of Florida
 Martha M. Pacold‡ (born 1979) – district judge, United States District Court for the Northern District of Illinois (appointed by Trump)
 Sarah Pitlyk‡ (born 1977) – district judge, United States District Court for the Eastern District of Missouri (appointed by Trump)
 Patrick Wyrick† (born 1981) – district judge, United States District Court for the Western District of Oklahoma (appointed by Trump)

State supreme courts
 Keith R. Blackwell** (born 1975) – Associate Justice, Supreme Court of Georgia
 Charles T. Canady** (born 1954) – Chief Justice, Supreme Court of Florida
 Thomas Rex Lee* (born 1964) – Associate Justice, Utah Supreme Court
 Edward Mansfield** (born 1957) – Associate Justice, Iowa Supreme Court
 Carlos G. Muñiz‡ (born 1969) – Associate Justice, Supreme Court of Florida
 Robert P. Young Jr.** (born 1951) – former chief justice, Michigan Supreme Court

Executive branch
 Paul Clement‡ (born 1966) – former solicitor general of the United States
 Steven Engel‡ (born 1974) – United States assistant attorney general for the Office of Legal Counsel
 Noel Francisco‡ (born 1969) – former solicitor general of the United States
 Christopher Landau‡ (born 1963) – United States ambassador to Mexico
 Kate Comerford Todd‡ (born 1975) – Deputy Assistant to the President and Deputy Counsel to the President

United States senators
 Tom Cotton‡ (born 1977) – Senator from Arkansas
 Ted Cruz‡ (born 1970) – Senator from Texas
 Josh Hawley‡ (born 1979) – Senator from Missouri
 Mike Lee** (born 1971) – Senator from Utah

State executive branches
 Daniel Cameron‡ (born 1985) – Attorney General of Kentucky

See also
 Judicial appointment history for United States federal courts
 List of federal judges appointed by Donald Trump

Notes

References

External links
 "Resources: Potential U.S. Supreme Court Nominees of President-Elect Donald Trump", The Institute for Intermediate Study (tifis.org)
 "Donald J. Trump Releases List of Potential United States Supreme Court Justices", donaldjtrump.com (May 18, 2016).
 "Donald J. Trump Finalizes List of Potential Supreme Court Justice Picks" donaldjtrump.com (September 23, 2016).

Supreme Court candidates

United States Supreme Court candidates by president
Conservatism-related lists